The Women's Building or Woman's Building may refer to:
Woman's Building (Charleston, South Carolina), a part of the South Carolina Inter-State and West Indian Exposition, 1902
The Woman's Building (Chicago), a part of the World's Columbian Exposition, 1892
Woman's Building (Los Angeles), a non-profit arts and education center located in Los Angeles, California
The Women's Building (San Francisco), a women-led non-profit arts and education community center located in San Francisco, California